Paristan Lake is a lake in Pakistan. It is the highest lake in Pakistan and also one of the highest lakes in the world.

References

Lakes of Pakistan